Jacobus Henricus Kann (The Hague, 12 July 1872 – Theresienstadt, 7 October 1944) was a Dutch Jewish banker and partner of the Lissa & Kann banking house. He was among the main leaders of the early Zionist Movement

Life and work
At the Seventh Zionist Congress (1905) Kann  was elected to the Executive of the World Zionist Organization (known then as the "Smaller Actions Committee"), which at the Eighth Zionist Congress (1907) was reduced to three members, Kann, Wolffsohn, and Otto Warburg. He had very cordial and close relations with David Wolffsohn, who replaced Herzl as the Zionist leader - being Wolffsohn's personal friend and strongly supporting Wolffsohn in the often uphill struggle to prove himself a worthy successor to the charismatic Herzl. Hundreds of letters exchanged between Kann and Wolfson are preserved at the Central Zionist Archives in Jerusalem, testifying to the close and affectionate relations between them.

Bibliography

 N. Sokolow, History of Zionism, 2 (1919), index  
 A. Boehm, Die Zionistische Bewegung, 1 (1935), index 
 T. Herzl, Complete Diaries, ed. and tr. by R. Patai (1960), index 
 J. Simon, in: Haaretz (March 11, 1945)
 Joan Comay, Who´s Who in Jewish History after the Period of the Old Testament, London, Routledge, 17/08/1995, p. 213
 Geoffrey Wigoder (Ed.), New Encyclopedia of Zionism and Israel, Tome 2, London et Toronto, Madison : Fairleigh Dickinson University Press, 1994, p. 787
 M.H. Gans, Memorboek. Platenatlas van het leven der joden in Nederland van de middeleeuwen tot 1940 (6e bijgewerkte druk; Baarn 1988) 611-612

References

External links
In the Jewish Virtual Library 
J.H. Kann op historici.nl (Dutch Language)
 Jacob Kann en de stichting van Tel Aviv (Dutch Language)

Speech by His Majesty King Willem-Alexander at a dinner on the occasion of the visit to the Netherlands by President Shimon Peres of Israel 

1872 births
1944 deaths
Dutch bankers
Dutch Jews
Dutch Zionists
20th-century Dutch diplomats
Zionist organizations
Dutch people who died in Nazi concentration camps